Laura Mennell (born 18 April 1980) is a Canadian actress known for her roles in Thirteen Ghosts, Alphas, Haven, Loudermilk, The Man in the High Castle, Watchmen and Batwoman. In 2011/2012 Mennell co-starred on the Sci-fi television series Alphas. Laura appeared as Charlotte Cross in the fifth season of the SyFy series Haven, and she starred in the comedy series Loudermilk from 2017 to 2020. Despite being best known for her numerous science fiction roles, Mennell says she is not concerned about being typecast.

Early life
Mennell is of Irish, British, and French ancestry. She says she was a "major theatre geek in high school."

Mennell is a cousin of Alan Young, who was the voice of Scrooge McDuck and star of the classic TV series Mister Ed (1961).

Personal life
She is a vegetarian and is fluent in French.

Filmography

References

External links
 
 

1980 births
Actresses from British Columbia
Canadian film actresses
Canadian television actresses
Living people
People from Surrey, British Columbia
Canadian people of Irish descent
Canadian people of French descent
Canadian people of Scottish descent
Canadian people of British descent